Canal Parlamento is a Spanish TV channel dedicated to broadcast live coverage of Spanish Courts from Congreso de los Diputados in Madrid, Spain.

Legislature broadcasters
Television channels and stations established in 2000
Television stations in Spain
Spanish-language television stations
2000 establishments in Spain